Carl Ebeling is a United States computer scientist and professor. His recent interests include coarse-grained reconfigurable architectures of integrated circuits.

Education and career

He earned MS from Southern Illinois University Carbondale (1976) and Ph.D. in computer science from Carnegie-Mellon University (1986). Since 1986 he was with the Department of Computer Science & Engineering, University of Washington, full professor since 1997. In late 2012, he left his academic position for a position at Altera.

Work
He was a member of the team which created the chess machine HiTech. HiTech was the highest ranked chess machine for some time in mid-1980s until it was surpassed by Deep Blue.

His other projects include Gemini and Gemini2, open source programs for graph isomorphism used for netlist comparison in layout versus schematic IC verification.

Awards
Ebeling's Ph.D. thesis All the Right Moves: A VLSI Architecture for Chess earned him the 1986 Doctoral Dissertation Award from the Association for Computing Machinery.

American Association for Artificial Intelligence bestowed Ebeling with the Pioneer in Computer Chess award (1989).

His work on HiTech was recognized with the Allen Newell Award for Research Excellence (1997).

In 2011 he was inducted as a Fellow of the Association for Computing Machinery.

References

Year of birth missing (living people)
Living people
University of Washington faculty
Southern Illinois University Carbondale alumni
Carnegie Mellon University alumni
Fellows of the Association for Computing Machinery